The post/unit of a Fliegerfuhrer was a provisional headquarters for flying units as part of the Second World War's Luftwaffe Organization.

Fliegerführer

Jagdfliegerführer
A Jagdfliegerführer, or Jafü, was the commander of the Fighter forces of a Luftflotte.

References
Notes

References
 Fliegerführer @ Lexikon der Wehrmacht